Paul Ellingworth (15 November 1931 – 25 November 2018) was an Honorary Professor in New Testament at the School of Divinity, History & Philosophy of the University of Aberdeen and former translation consultant for the United Bible Societies. He wrote several books on biblical matters, notably on Hebrews. He lived in Aberdeen.

Education
He studied as an undergraduate at Worcester College, Oxford; earning a Bachelor of Arts in 1953 and an MA in 1957. Moving to study further at Wesley House, Cambridge gaining another BA in 1956.

His doctoral thesis was The Old Testament in Hebrews Exegesis, Method and Hermeneutics which was completed in 1977 at Aberdeen University. Hebrews became his clear area of expertise and he returned to it repeatedly in his writing and speaking.

Career
Ellingworth lectured in Benin at the École de Théologie, Porto-Novo from 1957-1961 after which in Cameroon at the Faculté de Théologie Protestante, Yaoundé for the period 1964-1967. He served as the Education Secretary to the Methodist Missionary Society based in London from 1967-1971. He specialised in translation work and during 1971 to 1975 was coordinator to the United Bible Societies, London. Based at his home in Aberdeen, United Kingdom he was from 1975 a translation consultant; also working as a technical editor 1972-1975.

He served as Associate Director at the Center for the Study of Christianity in the Non-Western World. He was an Honorary fellow University Edinburgh and additionally became Honorary lecturer University Aberdeen in 1983.

Works

Books

As translator

Chapters

 General editor and contributor, The Good News Study Bible (Swindon 1997) 
 Translator for Religion Past and Present (Leiden) English version of Religion in Geschichte und Gegenwart, 4th edition

n.b. possible contributions to Dictionary of Bible Translation (Rome & New York, forthcoming)

Journal articles

Personal life
Ellingworth was born in Barnsley, England on 15 November 1931 the son of William C. and Olive Ellingworth. He married Pauline Mary Coates on 23 May 1959 and they had three sons.

References

External links
 Ellingworth's books at Amazon.com

1931 births
2018 deaths
Arminian theologians
Academics of the University of Aberdeen
British biblical scholars
New Testament scholars